The Genesis GV70 is a Compact luxury crossover SUV manufactured by Korean luxury automaker Genesis, a luxury vehicle division of Hyundai. Internally codenamed JK1, it is the second SUV model from the brand after the mid-size GV80.

Overview

Electrified GV70 
The Electrified GV70 (or the eGV70) is the battery electric version of the GV70. It was revealed at the Auto Guangzhou on November 19, 2021, and officially released on March 16, 2022. The Electrified GV70 will feature a dual motor setup with all wheel drive. According to Genesis, the Electrified GV70 can charge from 10% to 80% in 18 minutes using a 350 kW charger. It has 503 liters of the trunk and 22 liters of frunk capacity. A 12.3-inch cluster with a GUI dedicated to electric models was applied.

Powertrain

Safety

Euro NCAP test results for a LHD, five door on a registration from 2021.

Awards 
The GV70 won the 2022 Motor Trend SUV of the Year.

Sales

Notes

References

External links 

 
  (Electrified GV70)

GV70
Cars introduced in 2020
Compact sport utility vehicles
Luxury crossover sport utility vehicles
Rear-wheel-drive vehicles
All-wheel-drive vehicles
Production electric cars